Rey Francisco Guadalupe Sánchez (born October 5, 1967) is a Puerto Rican former Major League Baseball infielder. He attended high school in California and was drafted in the 13th round of the  amateur baseball draft by the Texas Rangers. He played in their minor league system until , when he was traded to the Chicago Cubs for minor leaguer Bryan House. In , he broke through to the majors, playing 13 games. He continued to play there, often on a regular basis until August 16, when he was traded to the New York Yankees for minor leaguer Frisco Parotte. He finished the season there, and then started to become a journeyman. He played (in order) in a season for the San Francisco Giants, two and a half seasons for the Kansas City Royals, 50 games for the Atlanta Braves, and a season for the Boston Red Sox.

He spent most of his career occasionally starting, replacing injured players, and pinch hitting at shortstop, second base, and third base, although he consistently started at shortstop for the Royals and Braves, and consistently started at second base for the Red Sox. Other than this, he played any infield position off the bench. He had a career .272 batting average and only 15 home runs through 15 years experience. He was often used for his ability to successfully perform the sacrifice bunt.

External links

1967 births
Living people
People from Río Piedras, Puerto Rico
Atlanta Braves players
Boston Red Sox players
Chicago Cubs players
Kansas City Royals players
New York Mets players
New York Yankees players
Tampa Bay Devil Rays players
San Francisco Giants players
Seattle Mariners players
Major League Baseball second basemen
Major League Baseball shortstops
Major League Baseball players from Puerto Rico
Gulf Coast Rangers players
Gastonia Rangers players
Charlotte Rangers players
Oklahoma City 89ers players
Iowa Cubs players